Clavus similis is a species of sea snail, a marine gastropoda mollusk in the family Drilliidae.

Description
The length of the shell attains 14.6 mm.

Distribution
This marine species occurs off the Philippines.

Original description
 Stahlschmidt P., Poppe G.T. & Tagaro S.P. (2018). Descriptions of remarkable new turrid species from the Philippines. Visaya. 5(1): 5-64 page(s): 18, pl. 10 figs 3-4.

References

External links

 Worms Link

similis